Muhammad Azmeer Aris bin Nor Rashid (born 5 August 1999) is a Malaysian footballer who plays as a left-back for Penang.

Azmeer started his career as a winger; he plays as a left-back since 2021.

Career statistics

Club

References

External links

1999 births
Living people
Malaysian footballers
Malaysia Premier League players
Malaysia Super League players
Penang F.C. players
Association football defenders